Reginbert of Reichenau (died 846) was a librarian, scholar and author active at the abbey of Reichenau. He made major contributions building up the important book collection of the monastery. Among his major works is the "Library of Symbols", which was written around 820.

References 
 https://web.archive.org/web/20151005173349/http://www.blb-karlsruhe.de/blb/blbhtml/besondere-bestaende/provenienz/reichenau.php
 Müller R: Reginbert von (der) Reichenau. In: Deutsches Literatur-Lexikon. 3. Edition. 19 (1999). P. 515.

846 deaths
German abbots
Year of birth unknown